2004 Kabaddi World Cup was the first ever Kabaddi World Cup and was hosted by India. India won the title defeating Iran 55–27 in the final.

Teams
With last minute withdrawal of Pakistan and Afghanistan, 12 teams competed in the tournament.

Pools
The teams were divided into three pools of four teams each.

Competition format
Twelve teams competed in tournament consisting of two rounds. In the first round, teams were divided into three pools of four teams each, and followed round-robin format with each of the team playing all other teams in the pool once.
Following the completion of the league matches, teams placed first and second in each pool advanced to a single elimination round consisting of four quarterfinals, two semifinal games, and a final.

Schedule
All matches' timings were according to Indian Standard Time (UTC +5:30).

Group stage

Pool A

Pool B

Pool C

Knockout stage

Quarter-finals

Semi-finals

Final

References

Kabaddi World Cup
Kabaddi
Sports competitions in Mumbai
Kabaddi competitions in India